KTSB (1170 AM) is a commercial radio station in Tulsa, Oklahoma. It is owned by Griffin Communications and airs a sports radio format. The station carries local sports talk. KTSB studios and offices are located across from Guthrie Green in Downtown Tulsa, and it transmits from a three-tower facility located along East 11th Street (Route 66) in an undeveloped area of East Tulsa.

KTSB is a clear channel Class A station broadcasting at 50,000 watts, the maximum power for American AM stations. The station uses a non-directional antenna by day, heard over much of Eastern Oklahoma and parts of Kansas, Arkansas and Missouri. It provides secondary coverage as far north as Wichita, as far east as Fayetteville, Arkansas and as far west as the fringes of the Oklahoma City area. Under the right conditions, it can be heard across nearly all of Oklahoma's densely populated area, as well as Springfield, Fort Smith and the outer suburbs of Kansas City. At night, power is fed to all three towers in a directional pattern to protect the other Class A station on 1170 AM, WWVA in Wheeling, West Virginia. Even with this restriction, KTSB's nighttime signal can be heard over much of the Central United States and well into the Rocky Mountains with a good radio.

History

Station founding
Founded by E. H. Rollestone, KTSB first signed on the air on June 23, 1926, as KVOO, the "Voice Of Oklahoma." At the time, the 1,000-watt transmission facility was located in Bristow, Oklahoma. Rollestone, a young oil millionaire, had previously founded another station in Bristow known as KFRU, which had already been sold to Stephens College in Columbia, Missouri.

KVOO was moved to Tulsa on September 13, 1927, after being partially purchased by William G. Skelly. Skelly later purchased the entire company on June 28, 1928. In 1933, radio legend Paul Harvey began his radio career at KVOO.

Country music heritage
From the 1970s until May 2002, the station was primarily known for its country music heritage, as well as being nationally famous for Western swing music. KVOO hosted such musicians as Bob Wills and his Texas Playboys, Johnnie Lee Wills and Billy Parker, who has won awards as country music disc jockey of the year. One of the places in Tulsa made famous by KVOO Radio was Cain's Ballroom, located on Main Street. Cain's Ballroom was the performing place for Bob Wills, with live broadcasts on KVOO. In addition, KVOO hosted The John Chick Show, a full hour of local country music talent also seen on ABC-TV network affiliate KTUL Channel 8 until 1979. This program broadcast at 7 a.m., and regularly beat out NBC's Today Show and The CBS Morning News in the local ratings. (This was at a time when ABC had no morning news program). When ABC premiered Good Morning America in 1975, KTUL continued to air the Chick program instead. When Elton Rule, president of ABC, visited KTUL-TV to see why the ABC affiliate was pre-empting Good Morning America, Jimmy C. Leake, owner of KTUL-TV, showed the Tulsa ratings book to Rule, and ABC backed off. KTUL began carrying GMA in 1979, when Chick left the station due to multiple sclerosis.

Noted DJs and performers
In 1971, Billy Parker joined KVOO. While at the station, Parker's awards included the Country Music Association Disc Jockey of the Year honor in 1974 and the Academy of Country Music Disc Jockey of the Year awards in 1975, 1977, 1978 and 1984. Parker was inducted into the Country Music Disc Jockey Hall of Fame in 1992, the Western Swing Hall of Fame in 1993, and scored the Oklahoma Association of Broadcasters' Lifetime Achievement Award in 1995. The Interstate Road Show was also hosted on the station by veteran country DJ Larry Scott who is also in the Country Music Disc Jockey Hall of Fame. The last live country show was broadcast by veteran Tulsa radio personality Bob O'Shea, who first worked at Big Country AM 1170 KVOO in 1979. He later rejoined KVOO AM in August 1999 and retired from radio June 26, 2006, after more than 34 years in radio. He recorded the entire program including commercials for posterity. The last three songs Mr. O'Shea played were "Hello Out There" by Billy Parker, "T-U-L-S-A, Straight Ahead" by Ray Benson & Asleep at the Wheel and "Take Me Back To Tulsa" by Bob Wills and The Texas Playboys.

Switch to talk

At midnight on May 15, 2002, KVOO changed to KFAQ with a talk radio format. Most of the DJs moved to co-owned 98.5 KVOO-FM and that station added more classic country. In 2003, co-owned KXBL flipped to all-classic country music, playing many of the same songs KVOO AM aired. KXBL calls itself "Big Country," the same slogan KVOO AM used when it was at its height.

KVOO-TV
The NBC television affiliate in Tulsa, KJRH-TV, went on the air as KVOO-TV on December 5, 1954, and both KVOO-TV and Radio shared the same building for many years. In 1970, KVOO sold off KVOO-TV to Scripps-Howard Broadcasting (now the E. W. Scripps Company), and station's call letters became KTEW. In 1980, KTEW became KJRH, which it remains today.

Former owner Journal announced on July 30, 2014, that it would merge with Scripps, with Scripps retaining the two firms' broadcasting properties, including KFAQ. This deal reunited KFAQ with KJRH-TV.

On June 26, 2018, Scripps announced that it would sell KFAQ, along with sister stations, Tulsa-based KVOO-FM and KBEZ (92.9 FM), Muskogee-licensed KHTT (106.9 FM) and Henryetta-licensed KXBL-FM (99.5) to Oklahoma City-based Griffin Communications for $12.5 million; the sale would put the stations under the ownership of CBS affiliate KOTV-DT (channel 6) and CW affiliate KQCW-DT (channel 19), both competitors to KJRH. Griffin began operating the stations under a local marketing agreement on July 30, and completed the purchase October 1.

The call letters changed to KTSB on September 6, 2021. On September 7, 2021, "The Talk 1170" turned into "The Blitz 1170" with a sports format.

References

External links

TSB
Sports radio stations in the United States
Radio stations established in 1926
1926 establishments in Oklahoma
Griffin Media
Clear-channel radio stations
Fox Sports Radio stations